The Toshiba T1100 is a laptop manufactured by Toshiba in 1985, and has subsequently been described by Toshiba as "the world's first mass-market laptop computer". Its technical specifications were comparable to the original IBM PC desktop, using floppy disks (it had no hard drive), a 4.77 MHz Intel 80C88 CPU (a lower-power variation of the Intel 8088), 256 KB of conventional RAM extendable to 512 KB, and a monochrome LCD capable of displaying 80x25 text and 640x200 CGA graphics. Its original price was 1899 USD.

The T1100 PLUS is a later model of this laptop, released to the market in 1986. Some significant differences to the T1100 are: 16-bit data bus 80C86 CPU, 7.16 MHz or 4.77 MHz operation, 256 KB of conventional RAM (16-bit) extendable to 640 KB, and two internal 720 KB 3.5" diskette drives.

The T1100 was named an IEEE Milestone in 2009.

Clones 
Toshiba T1100 PLUS was cloned in the USSR as Electronika MS 1504 in 1991.

See also 
 Toshiba T1000
 Toshiba T1200
 Toshiba T3100
 Embeddable Linux Kernel Subset (ELKS formerly Linux-8086)

References

External links 
 T1100 information at minuszerodegrees.net
 360 degree view of T1100 at Russian Vintage Laptop Museum
 360 degree view of T1100 PLUS at Russian Vintage Laptop Museum

T1100
Early laptops